The Steel Trap is a 1952 American film noir written and directed by Andrew L. Stone and starring Joseph Cotten and Teresa Wright.

Plot
With a million dollars cash in the vault, Jim Osborne (Joseph Cotten),  a long term bank employee who has advanced to assistant bank manager in Los Angeles, is tempted to steal from his own bank and flee the country. Doing research at the library, he learns that Brazil has no extradition treaty with the United States. If he steals the money at close of business on a Friday, he will have time to travel to Brazil before the theft is discovered on Monday's opening. But the season when the bank opens on Saturdays is about to begin, so he must take action the same week or else wait for months.

He tells his wife Laurie (Teresa Wright) that the bank is sending him to Rio de Janeiro on business and he wants her and their daughter to travel with him. It is a great opportunity for his career, he says, and he has been given it in preference over the person who would normally be sent, so he cautions her not to talk to anyone about it. Laurie is delighted with the news, but insists their daughter stay at home with Laurie's mother. Jim decides he can send for her after Laurie knows they are staying in Rio.

With his inside knowledge and trusted position, the theft from the bank vault is simple enough, though time-sensitive and stressful; but the travel logistics are difficult. Because of the late timing the direct flights are full, and passports and visas are needed on a rush basis. The Osbornes face a series of issues and delays and ultimately miss a connection at New Orleans. At this point an airline employee, made suspicious by Jim's urgent manner and very heavy baggage, tips off a customs officer. Customs checks his baggage on the possibility he is illegally exporting gold, and the $1 million in cash is discovered.

Unreported large cash transactions are not illegal in 1952, but the customs man knows it is not normal for a bank to send only a single employee with so much cash on commercial travel. Though he suspects some wrongdoing, he cannot reach Jim's boss by telephone before the Osbornes' flight is called, and as there is no customs violation and Osborne threatens to sue him personally for his business losses, the officer lets them go. However, they are on standby and the flight is full and leaves without them. They will not be able to reach Rio on Sunday. Now fearing arrest, Jim checks into a hotel using a false name. Laurie hears the desk clerk call Jim by this other name and finally realizes the truth; she confronts him. When he admits what he has done, she wants no part in it; she leaves the hotel and flies back home to Los Angeles.

Within hours Jim realizes that his wife and daughter are far more important to him than his dreams of wealth. Laurie was too upset to tell anyone why she had suddenly returned. Jim calls her with a plan to return the money before the bank opens and as he has used only their money for the travel expenses the bank's money is intact. Jim flies back and just manages to replace the money in the vault before the bank opens. He is so emotionally drained that his fellow employees send him home sick where he reunites with Laurie.

Cast

 Joseph Cotten as Jim Osborne
 Teresa Wright as Laurie Osborne
 Jonathan Hale as Tom Bowers
 Walter Sande as Customs Inspector
 Eddie Marr as Ken Woodley
 Carleton Young as Briggs, Airline Clerk
 Katherine Warren as Mrs. Kellogg
 Tom Powers as Valcourt, Travel Agent
 Stephanie King as Susan Osborne
 Aline Towne as Gail Woodley
 Hugh Sanders as Greer, Passport Clerk
 Marjorie Stapp as Travel Agent
 William Hudson as Raglin, Bank Teller #2

Background
This was the second time that Cotten and Wright starred in a film together, following Alfred Hitchcock's Shadow of a Doubt (1943), in which she played his niece. Cotten was cast after visiting an osteopath and running into producer Bert Frielob, who sent him the script. Cotten agreed to make it.

The film was also known as Panic Stricken.

It was shot in two weeks, in the studio and in New Orleans, in April 1952.

Cotten also starred in A Blueprint for Murder (1953), with Jean Peters and Gary Merrill, a thriller noir also directed by Andrew L. Stone.

Reception
When the film was released, The New York Times film critic Bosley Crowther offered qualified praise, writing, "The Steel Trap, which came to Loew's State yesterday, is a straight exercise in the build-up of cold, agonizing suspense ... As a purely contrived generation of runaway anxiety, this little melodrama amounts to a skillful and no-lost-motion job—so long as the innocent observer doesn't stop to think and check up. ... Indeed, it's an entertaining picture—the entertainment, however, being of the sort enjoyed by the man who hit himself on the head with a hammer because it felt so good when he stopped."

Variety magazine wrote of the film, "Andrew Stone’s direction of his own story emphasizes suspense that is leavened with welcome chuckles of relief in telling the improbable but entertaining events."

References

External links
 
 
 
 The Steel Trap informational site and DVD review at DVD Beaver (includes images)
 The Steel Trap essay by Robert Cashill at Cineaste
 The Steel Trap essay by Richard Harland Smith at TCM
 

1952 films
1950s crime thriller films
20th Century Fox films
American black-and-white films
American crime thriller films
Film noir
Films about bank robbery
Films directed by Andrew L. Stone
Films scored by Dimitri Tiomkin
Films set in Los Angeles
Films set in New Orleans
1950s English-language films
1950s American films